Multinomial may refer to:

 Multinomial theorem, and the multinomial coefficient
 Multinomial distribution
 Multinomial logistic regression
 Multinomial test
 Multi-index notation
 Polynomial